Miarolitic cavities (or miarolitic texture) are typically crystal-lined irregular cavities or vugs most commonly found in granitic pegmatites, and also in a variety of igneous rocks. The central portions of pegmatites are often miarolitic as the pegmatite dike crystallizes from the outside walls toward the center. The volatile portion of the magma is gradually excluded from the forming crystal phases until it becomes trapped within the body and forms the cavities which often contain minerals of elements incompatible with the typical silicate granitic mineralogy.

The miarolitic cavities and miarolitic pegmatites are sources of rare and unusual minerals containing elements not found in abundance in normal igneous rocks. Minerals containing lithium, rubidium, beryllium, boron, niobium, tantalum, tin, bismuth, fluorine and other elements can be found.

The term miarolitic comes from the Italian miarole in reference to the mineral-rich pegmatite region of Baveno and Cuasso al Monte in northern Italy.

References
 PDF London, David, Formation of tourmaline-rich gem pockets in miarolitic pegmatites American Mineralogist, Volume 71, pages 396–405, 1986
 London, David; Miarolitic Pegmatites

Mineralogy
Petrology